Jinping Miao, Yao, and Dai Autonomous County is located in Honghe Hani and Yi Autonomous Prefecture, Yunnan province, China, bordering Vietnam's Lai Châu Province to the south. Jinping is home to the Red-headed Yao minority group who wear a pointed red hat on their heads after they get married.

Administrative divisions
Jinping Miao, Yao, and Dai Autonomous County has 4 towns 8 townships and 1 ethnic township. 
4 towns

8 townships

1 ethnic township
 Zhemi Lahu

Ethnic groups

The Jinping County Gazetteer (1994:113-132) lists the following ethnic groups.
Miao
Black Miao / Mengba 蒙吧 / Mengshi 蒙施
Qingshui Miao / Mengnengcha 蒙能差; exonym: Mengbu 蒙补 / Mengbei 蒙背
Flowery Miao / Meng Leng 蒙冷
Piantou Miao / Meng Shua 蒙刷; exonym: Chinese Miao 汉苗 (least populous Miao subgroup)
White Miao / Mengdou 蒙逗
Yao
Yu Mian: Red-Headed Yao 红头瑶
Men 门: Landian Yao 蓝靛瑶, Pingtou Yao 平头瑶, Sha Yao 沙瑶
Dai
Dai Luo (Black Dai 黑傣, Dry Dai 旱傣): located in Kuchuyi 苦初邑, Shidong 石洞, Laomanhao 老蔓耗, Xiaohekou 小河口, Changtan 长滩
Dai Le (Pu'er Dai 普耳傣): located in Pu'erzhai 普耳寨 (Upper 上寨, Central 中寨, Lower 下寨 villages), Mengla Township/
Ludai Lunan (=  child of the water; also called Water Dai/ and White Dai/)

Zhuang
White Sha people (autonym: Bure 布惹)
Black Sha people (autonym: Kacha 卡查): Zhemi Township/ (in the 3 villages of Baha 巴哈村, Bayi 巴义, and Pingzhai 坪寨). 235 households and 965 persons as of 2005.
Lahu
Lahu Na (Black Lahu/)
Lahu Xi (Yellow Lahu/)
Lahu Pu (White Lahu/)

An alternate list gives the following ethnic minorities and subgroups. Locations are from the Jinping County Ethnic Gazetteer (2013:89, 101).
Miao
Flowery Miao
White Miao
Black Miao
Chinese Miao
Yao
Red-headed Yao
Landian Yao
Sha Yao
Dai
Water Dai
Black Dai
Pu'er Dai
Hani
Nongmen (Nuomei/): widely distributed across Jinping County. 10,323 households and 42,325 persons as of 2005. It is also spoken in Hanitian 哈尼田.
Nongbi (Nuobi/): in Jinhe Town and Tongchang Township/ (in 23 villages). 2,358 households and 9,902 persons as of 2005. It is also spoken in Hanitian 哈尼田.
Duoni: in Laojizhai Township/ (in the villages of Masasi 马撒斯, Bailezhai 白乐寨, and Dazhupeng 大竹棚). 793 households and 3,329 persons as of 2005.
Asuo: in Laojizhai Township/ (in the villages of Lilaochong 李老冲, Duosha 多沙, Baimazhai 白马寨, Baigou 白沟, Nanla 南拉, and Shaluo 沙啰). 356 households and 1,425 persons as of 2005.
Lami: in Laojizhai Township/ and Zhemi Township/ (in 20 villages). 2,135 households and 9,180 persons as of 2005.
Gehe (Gehe 格河; Gehuo 格活; in Laomeng Township/ their exonym is Angluo 昂珞): in Tongchang 铜厂, Yingpan 营盘, and Laomeng 老勐 townships. 2,563 households and 10,510 persons as of 2005. Gehuo 格活 is also spoken in Baima Shangzhai, Yingpan Township, Jinping County 金平县营盘乡白马上寨村. (This is not the same as Guohe 郭合 of Dengqu Village, Majie Township, Yuanjiang County 元阳县马街乡登去村.)
Guozuo (Guozhuo 郭卓): in Zhemi 者米, Mengla 勐拉, and Jinshuihe 金水河 townships. 1,953 households and 8,398 persons as of 2005.
Habei (Mani 玛尼): in Habei village 哈备村, Zhemi Township/. 56 households and 231 persons as of 2005.
Yi (speaking 4 languages: Nuosu 诺苏, Muji 姆基, Alu 阿鲁, and Laowu 老乌)
Nisu: in Jinhe 金河镇, Mengqiao 勐桥乡, and Laomeng 老勐乡 townships (in 19 villages). 1,134 households and 5,519 persons as of 2005.
Alu: in Yakouzhe Village 丫口遮村, Laojizhai Township/ (in the villages of Luopan 罗盘, Tiantou 田头, Huilongzhai 回龙寨, Laozhai 老寨, Zhongzhai 中寨, Xihadi 西哈底, Heishan 黑山, Amilong 阿咪笼, Kabianzhai 卡边寨, Anlezhai 安乐寨, Nanlu 南鲁, etc.). 1,264 households and 5,307 persons as of 2005.
Pula
Muji: widely distributed across Jinping County
Laowu (autonym: Laoyong/): in Laojizhai 老集寨, Laomeng 老勐, Yingpan 营盘, and Mengla 勐拉 townships (in 29 villages). 2,222 households and 9,342 persons as of 2005.
Tulao: in the 2 villages of Yugadi 鱼嘎底, Xinzhai Village 新寨村, Mengqiao Township ; and Laowangzhai 老王寨, Qingjiao Village 箐脚村, Dazhai Township 
Zhuang
Sha
Nong
Lahu
Black Lahu
Yellow Lahu
White Lahu
Bulang (autonym: Mang/): in the 4 villages of Leigong Daniu 雷公打牛, Pinghe Zhongzhai 坪河中寨, Pinghe Xiazhai 平河下寨, Nanke Xinzhai 南科新寨 (also known as Longfeng village 龙凤村), all of which are administered by Jinshuihe Town. 110 households and 682 persons as of 2005.

The Lahu of Jinping County reside in the following villages (Jinping County Ethnic Gazetteer 2013:127). Village names are from 1985.
Zhemi Ethnic Lahu Township/
Lower Xinzhai Village 下新寨村委会: in Niudi 牛底, Upper Liangzhu 上良竹, Middle Liangzhu 中良竹 (now part of Lower Liangzhu 下良竹), Lower Liangzhu 下良竹, Upper Namihe 上纳迷河, Lower Namihe 下纳迷河, Jinzhuzhai 金竹寨, Laobaizhai 老白寨, Baixiaocun 白小村, Xincun 新村 (now part of Jinzhuzhai 金竹寨 and Baixiaocun 白小村), Longtang 龙塘, Zhongjianhe 中间河 (now part of Baixiaocun 白小村, Niudicun 牛底村, Jinzhuzhai 金竹寨); also in Kucong Xinzhai 苦聪新寨
Baha Village 巴哈村委会: in Sulu 苏鲁, Nanlu 南鲁, Dongshan Xiaozhai 东山小寨
Dingqing Village 顶青村委会: in Dipeng 地棚, Gudeng 古灯, Chaye 茶叶村, Laopuzhai 老普寨 (now part of Tuanjiezhai 团结寨), Nanmen 南门村, Liuliu Xinzhai 六六新寨, Liuqi Xinzhai 六七新寨, Tuanjiezhai 团结寨, Kucong Dazhai 苦聪大寨 (now called Dazhai 大寨村), Liangzi village 2 良子二队, Laoyangzhai 老杨寨
Hebianzhai Village 河边寨村委会: in Jinzhuzhai 金竹寨 (now known as Yingfang village 营房村), Dongfeng 东风, Laolinjiao village 1 老林脚一队, Laolinjiao village 2 老林脚二队
Jinshuihe Town
Pujiao Village 普角村委会: in Kucongzhai 苦聪寨 (now known as Lahu village 拉祜村)
Nanke Village 南科村委会: in Lianfang 联防村, Mujichong 母鸡冲村, Laobaizhai 老白寨, Xiaoyan 小岩
Mengla Township/
Laowuzhai Village 老乌寨村委会: in Daqi 大其苦聪寨 (now known as Daqi 1st and 2nd Lahu villages 大其拉祜一, 二队)
Wengdang Village 翁当村委会: in Kucong Xinzhai 苦聪新寨 (now known as Lahu Xinzhai 拉祜新寨)

The Gezou/, a Hani subgroup, are found in the following villages of Jinping County (note: Hani village name followed by Chinese name).
District 3 三区: Lijiazha 里加扎 (Wengdang 翁当寨), Naniupuma 那纽普玛 (Daqi 大其寨), Naniuzha 那纽扎 (Xiaoqi 小其寨)
District 4 四区: Gouqiezha 苟切扎 (Wuleguo 五了果寨), Silouqiuzha 斯楼丘扎 (Duguo 独果寨), Dapuzha 达普扎 (Ping'an 平安寨), Qiemazha 切玛扎 (Hebian 河边寨), Wupuzha 吴普扎 (Xin'an 新安寨)

The Apu/ (also known as Bokho), an Yi subgroup, are found in Ma'andi Township/.

The Luoluopo/ or Luopo/ are found in Luopan Shangzhai 罗盘上寨, Jinping County and in Zhongzhai 中寨, Dashuigou 大水沟 Township, Lüchun County. The Luopo of Jinping believe that their ancestors had migrated from Pu'er and Mojiang County, while the Luopo of Lüchun believe that their ancestors had migrated from Dali.

Gallery

Climate

References

Further reading 
Jinping County Ethnic Gazetteer Editorial Committee (ed). 2013. Jinping County Ethnic Gazetteer 金平苗族瑤族傣族自治县民族志. Kunming: Yunnan People’s Press 云南民族出版社.

External links

Jinping County Official Website

County-level divisions of Honghe Prefecture
Miao autonomous counties
Yao autonomous counties
Dai autonomous counties